Anonaepestis is a genus of snout moths. It was erected by Émile Louis Ragonot in 1894.

Species
 Anonaepestis bengalella Ragonot, 1894 (from India to Australia)
 Anonaepestis tamsi Bradley, 1965 (from Cameroon and the Central African Republic)

References
"Anonaepestis Ragonot, 1894" at Markku Savela's Lepidoptera and Some Other Life Forms. Retrieved June 17, 2017.

Phycitini
Pyralidae genera
Taxa named by Émile Louis Ragonot